Get Thee Out is a 1991 Soviet drama film directed by Dmitry Astrakhan. The film was selected as the Soviet entry for the Best Foreign Language Film at the 64th Academy Awards, but was not accepted as a nominee.

Plot
The film was based on literary works of Sholom Aleichem, Aleksandr Kuprin and Isaac Babel.

Cast
 Otar Megvinetukhutsesi as Motya Rabinovich
 Elena Anisimova as Golda
 Tamari Skhirtladze as Sora-Broha
 Tatyana Kuznetsova as Beylka
   as Trofim
 Vladimir Kabalin as Ivan
   as Petya
 Kseniya Rappoport as Sima
 Nikolai Rybnikov as Nikifor, innkeeper
  as constable
 Viktor Bychkov as Yegor

Production
Making his debut in cinema, the young theater director from Leningrad Dmitry Astrakhan, along with his permanent co-author playwright Oleg Danilov, turned to the Jewish theme, which was as popular in the late 1980s as the Stalinist theme. According to Astrakhan's recollections, he was allocated 100,000 rubles for a movie worth a million rubles at the prices of that time on Lenfilm. The remaining 900 thousand he found through a journalist Vladimir Kamyshev.

See also
 List of submissions to the 64th Academy Awards for Best Foreign Language Film
 List of Soviet submissions for the Academy Award for Best Foreign Language Film

References

External links
 
 Alexander Fedorov's Reviews
 Get Thee Out  at the KinoPoisk

1991 films
1991 drama films
1991 directorial debut films
Soviet drama films
1990s Russian-language films
Soviet comedy films
Lenfilm films
Adaptations of works by Aleksandr Kuprin
Films directed by Dmitry Astrakhan